Agawam is an unincorporated community in Clark County, Kentucky, United States.

On August 17, 1941, Roy Barnes, owner of a freight train, was killed in a drunk driving accident in Agawam.

References

Unincorporated communities in Clark County, Kentucky
Unincorporated communities in Kentucky